James Fitchie Cook  (November 10, 1879 – June 17, 1949) was a Major League Baseball player. Cook played in the  season with the Chicago Cubs. In 8 games, Cook had four hits in 26 at-bats. He played the outfield and batted and threw right-handed.

Cook was born in Dundee, Illinois and died in St. Louis, Missouri.

External links

1879 births
1949 deaths
Illinois Fighting Illini baseball players
Baseball players from Illinois
Major League Baseball outfielders
Chicago Cubs players
Des Moines Undertakers players
Boise Fruit Pickers players
Butte Miners players
Butte Fruit Pickers players
Oakland Oaks (baseball) players
Colorado Springs Millionaires players
Pueblo Indians players
Indianapolis Indians players
Binghamton Bingoes players
Elmira Colonels players
People from West Dundee, Illinois